ACT-462206 is a dual orexin receptor antagonist (IC50 for OX1 = 60nM, OX2 = 11nM) which has been investigated for the treatment of insomnia. In human trials, ACT-462206 produced dose-dependent sedative effects and was generally well tolerated, with residual sleepiness and headache being the most common adverse events.

Pharmacology
In humans, the sedative effects of ACT-462206 began 45 minutes after oral administration, and dissipated within 8 hours - consistent with a favorable pharmacodynamic profile for the treatment of insomnia. However, the pharmacokinetic profile of ACT-462206 diverges significantly from what would be expected based on behavioral effects. Elevated plasma concentrations of ACT-462206 are sustained for over 24–36 hours after administration - despite behavioral measures of sedation disappearing within 8 hours of administration.

References 

Orexin antagonists
Sulfonamides
Amides
Methoxy compounds
Pyrrolidines